Nova Southeastern University College of Pharmacy, is a school of tertiary education in pharmacy, a branch of Nova Southeastern University. It offers an entry level Doctor of Pharmacy program in three site and an international program in Davie.  The College also hosts a number of post-graduate residency programs.
The College of Pharmacy admitted its first class in 1987 to become the only College of Pharmacy in South Florida. Because of the profession's demand for greater clinical specialization, the College has since discontinued its baccalaureate degree program.  The college is accredited by the Accreditation Council for Pharmacy Education (ACPE).

History

Since admitting its charter class in 1987 the College of Pharmacy has:

 Graduated nearly 2,100 students
 Led the nation in the level of enrollment of Hispanic doctoral pharmacy students
 Developed a postgraduate Doctor of Pharmacy (Pharm.D.) program for bachelor-level students seeking further 
 Developed, in 1995, a Post baccalaureate Pharm.D. program utilizing interactive Compressed Video. The practicing pharmacists throughout the state of Florida and Puerto Rico who cannot afford to interrupt their careers or relocate to a college campus are enrolled in this innovative and flexible program.
 Expanded full-time entry-level degree programs to sites in West Palm Beach, Florida and Ponce, Puerto Rico.
 Expanded post-baccalaureate Pharm.D. degree programs for students in San Juan and Ponce, Puerto Rico, as well as Fort Myers, Florida; Jacksonville, Florida; Miami, Florida; Orlando, Florida; Tampa, Florida; and Boston, Massachusetts
 Developed residency programs in Psychiatric Pharmacy Practice, General Pharmacy Practice, Ambulatory Care, and Infectious Diseases
 Developed a Drug Information Center to provide area health care providers with current information on pharmaceuticals
 Brought the latest American pharmaceutical education to leading institutions of higher learning in Latin America. The program features faculty exchanges, collaboration on research projects, and seminars on advances in patient-oriented pharmacy.
 Developed two ambulatory care pharmacies for innovative teaching and testing of pharmacists' expanding roles
 Created a medicinal garden to serve as a repository for living medicinal plants for treating human illness and maintaining health. The purpose of the garden is to teach students the properties and roles of medicinal plants
 Created, in 2002, a degree program designed for international students who graduated from a pharmacy program in their country of origin.

References

External links

Nova Southeastern University
Educational institutions established in 1987
Pharmacy schools in Florida
1987 establishments in Florida